Charitodoronidae, known as mitre shells, are a taxonomic family of sea snails, widely distributed marine gastropod molluscs in the clade Mitroidea.

Genera
Genera in the family Charitodoronidaeinclude:
 Charitodoron Tomlin, 1932

References

External links 
  Fedosov A., Puillandre N., Herrmann M., Kantor Yu., Oliverio M., Dgebuadze P., Modica M.V. & Bouchet P. (2018). The collapse of Mitra: molecular systematics and morphology of the Mitridae (Gastropoda: Neogastropoda). Zoological Journal of the Linnean Society. 1-85